Gregg Wesley Toland, A.S.C. (May 29, 1904 – September 28, 1948) was an American cinematographer known for his innovative use of techniques such as deep focus, examples of which can be found in his work on Orson Welles' Citizen Kane (1941), William Wyler's The Best Years of Our Lives (1946), and John Ford's The Grapes of Wrath, and The Long Voyage Home (both, 1940). He is also known for his work as a director of photography for Wuthering Heights (1939), The Westerner (1940), Ball of Fire (1941), The Outlaw (1943), Song of the South (1946) and The Bishop's Wife (1947).

Toland earned six Academy Award nominations for Best Cinematography, and won for his work on Wuthering Heights. He was voted one of the top 10 most influential cinematographers in the history of film by the International Cinematographers Guild in 2003.

Career
Toland was born in Charleston, Illinois on May 29, 1904 to Jennie, a housekeeper, and Frank Toland. His mother moved to California several years after his parents divorced in 1910.

Toland got his start in the film industry at the age of 15, working as an office boy at the Fox studio. He became an assistant cameraman a year later.  

His trademark chiaroscuro, side-lit style originated by accident: While shooting the short film The Life and Death of 9413: a Hollywood Extra (1928), one of two available 400W bulbs burned out, leaving only a single bulb for lighting.

During the 1930s, Toland became the youngest cameraman in Hollywood but soon one of its most sought-after cinematographers. Over a seven-year span (1936–1942), he was nominated five times for the Academy Award for Best Cinematography, including an Academy Award for his work on Wuthering Heights (1939).  He worked with many of the leading directors of his era, including John Ford, Howard Hawks, Erich von Stroheim, King Vidor, Orson Welles, and William Wyler.

Just before his death, he was concentrating on the "ultimate focus" lens to make near and far objects equally distinct. "Just before he died he had worked out a new lens with which he had made spectacular shots. He carried in his wallet a strip of film taken with this lens, of which he was very proud. It was a shot of a face three inches from the lens, filling one-third of the left side of the frame. Three feet from the lens, in the center of the foreground, was another face, and then, over a hundred yards away was the rear wall of the studio, showing telephone wires and architectural details. Everything was in focus, from three inches to infinity".

Toland died in his sleep in Los Angeles, California on September 28, 1948 of coronary thrombosis at the age of 44. He is interred in the Hollywood Forever Cemetery in Hollywood, California.

Citizen Kane

Some film historians believe Citizen Kanes visual brilliance was due primarily to Toland's contributions, rather than director Orson Welles'. Many Welles scholars maintain that the visual style of Kane is similar to many of Welles's other films, and hence should be considered the director's work. Nevertheless, the Welles movies that most resemble Citizen Kane (The Magnificent Ambersons, The Stranger, and Touch of Evil) were shot by Toland collaborators Stanley Cortez and Russell Metty (at RKO).

In a 1970 interview on the Dick Cavett Show, Welles told the story of how he met Toland, whom Welles considered "the greatest cameraman who ever lived". Although Citizen Kane was Welles's first feature, Toland—whom Welles already knew by reputation—sought out the young director himself:

[Toland] came to my office and said, "I want to work in your picture. My name is Toland." And I said, "Why do you, Mr. Toland?" And he said, "Because you've never made a picture. You don't know what cannot be done." So I said, "But I really don't! Can you tell me?" And [Toland] said, "There's nothing to it." And [he] gave me a day-and-a-half lesson—and he was right!

While shooting Kane, Welles and Toland (among others) insisted that Welles gave lighting instructions that fall normally under the director of photography's responsibility. Many of the transitions in the film are done as lighting cues on set (such as the transition at the opening of the film from the outside of Xanadu into Kane's bedroom for his death), where lights are dimmed up and down on stage. Apparently, Welles was unaware that one could achieve the effects optically on a film so he instructed the crew to dim the lights the way you would on a theater production, which led to the unique dissolves. Different areas of the frame dissolve at different times, based on the lighting cue. However, the visuals were truly a collaboration, as Toland contributed great amounts of technical expertise that Welles needed so that he could achieve his vision. Years later, Welles acknowledged, "Toland was advising him on camera placement and lighting effects secretly so the young director would not be embarrassed in front of the highly experienced crew."

Cinematography innovations 
Toland's techniques were revolutionary in the art of cinematography. Cinematographers before him used a shallow depth of field to separate the various planes on the screen, creating an impression of space as well as stressing what mattered in the frame by leaving the rest (the foreground or background) out of focus. 

In Toland's lighting schemes, shadow became a much more compelling tool, both dramatically and pictorially, to separate the foreground from the background and so to create space within a two-dimensional frame while keeping all of the picture in focus. According to Toland, this visual style was more comparable with what the eyes see in real life since vision blurs what is not looked at rather than what is. 

For John Ford's The Long Voyage Home (1940), Toland leaned more heavily on back-projection to create his deep focus compositions, such as the shot of the island women singing to entice the men of the SS Glencairn. He continued to develop the technologies that would allow for him to create his images in Citizen Kane.

Deep focus and lighting techniques
Toland innovated extensively on Citizen Kane, creating deep focus on a sound-stage, collaborating with set designer Perry Ferguson so ceilings would be visible in the frame by stretching bleached muslin to stand in as a ceiling, allowing placement of the microphone closer to the action without being seen in frame. He also modified the Mitchell Camera to allow a wider range of movement, especially from low angles. ″It was Toland who devised a remote-control system for focusing his camera lens without having to get in the way of the camera operator who would now be free to pan and tilt the camera."

The main way to achieve deep focus was closing down the aperture, which required increasing the lighting intensity, lenses with better light transmission, and faster film stock. On Citizen Kane, the cameras and coated lenses used were of Toland's own design working in conjunction with engineers from Caltech. His lenses were treated with Vard Opticoat to reduce glare and increase light transmission. He used the Kodak Super XX film stock, which was, at the time, the fastest film available, with an ASA film speed of 100. Toland had worked closely with a Kodak representative during the stock's creation before its release in October 1938, and was one of the first cinematographers using it heavily on set.

Lens apertures employed on most productions were usually within the f/2.3 to f/3.5 range; Toland shot his scenes in between f/8 and f/16.  This was possible because several elements of technology came together at once: the technicolor three strip process, which required the development of more powerful lights, had been developed and the more powerful Carbon Arc light was beginning to be used.  By utilizing these lights with the faster stock, Toland was able to achieve apertures previously unattainable on a stage shoot.

Optical print shots and in-camera composites
Gregg Toland collaborated on a number of shots with special-effects cinematographer Linwood G. Dunn. Although these looked like they were using deep focus, they were actually a composite of two different shots. Some of these shots were composited with an optical printer, a device which Dunn improved upon over the years, which explains why foreground and background are both in focus even though the lenses and film stock used in 1941 could not allow for such depth of field. 

But Toland strongly disliked this technique, since he felt he was "duping," (i.e. a copy of a copy) thereby lowering the quality of his shots. Thus other shots (like the shot of Susan Alexander Kane's bedroom after her suicide attempt, with a glass in the foreground and Kane entering the room in the background) were in-camera composites, meaning the film was exposed twice—another technique that Linwood Dunn improved upon.

Citizen Kane and The Long Voyage Home
Toland had already had experience with heavy in-camera compositing, and many of the shots in Kane look similar in composition and dynamics to a number of shots in Ford's The Long Voyage Home.

For instance, both movies contain shots that create an artificial lighting situation such that a character is lit in the background and walks or runs through dark areas to the foreground, where his arrival triggers, off-screen, a light not on before. The result is so visually dramatic because a character moves, only barely visible, through vast pools of shadow, only to exit the shadow very close to the camera, where his whole face is suddenly completely lit. This use of much more shadow than light, soon one of the main techniques of low-key lighting, heavily influenced film noir.

The Long Voyage Home and Citizen Kane share a number of other striking similarities:

Both films allowed lenses at times to distort faces in close-up, especially during low-key lighting sequences described above.
Sets, both interiors and exteriors, were lit mostly from the floor instead of from the rafters high above. A radical departure from Hollywood's traditional lighting, this technique also took much longer to execute, thus contributing significantly to production costs. However, the effect was strikingly more realistic, since light sources placed closer to the characters allowed softer lighting, which lights placed far above the set could not produce. 
Both directors, Welles as well as Ford, put Toland's credit as cinematographer on screen at the same time as their own credit as director (director/producer in Welles's case), an unusual and conspicuously generous tribute; in both films, Toland's credit was also the same size as the director's.

Credit

In addition to sharing a title card with Toland on Kane — an indication of the high esteem the director held for his cameraman — Welles also gave him a cameo in the film as the reporter who is slow to ask questions when Kane returns from Europe. Welles called Toland, "the greatest gift any director—young or old—could ever, ever have. And he never tried to impress on us that he was performing miracles. He just went ahead and performed them. I was calling on him to do things only a beginner could be ignorant enough to think anybody could ever do, and there he was, doing them."

Toland was the subject of an "Annals of Hollywood" article in The New Yorker, "The Cameraman," by Hilton Als (June 19, 2006, p. 46).

Other important works
Although Citizen Kane is his most highly regarded achievement, his style was much more varied. For The Grapes of Wrath (1940), he took inspiration from Dorothea Lange's photographs, achieving a rare (for Hollywood) gritty and realist look. For one of his final projects, Toland turned to Technicolor film. Made for Disney, the Song of the South (1946) combined animation with live action in bright, deeply saturated Technicolor. In The Best Years of Our Lives (also 1946) his deep focus cinematography served to highlight all the aspects of the characters' lives.

Service during World War II
When the Office of the Coordinator of Information (predecessor to the Office of Strategic Services and later the Central Intelligence Agency) was created by Franklin Delano Roosevelt before the United States' entry into World War II, Toland was recruited to work in the agency's film unit. Toland was commissioned as a lieutenant in the Navy's camera department, which led to his only work as a director, December 7th: The Movie (1943). This documentary of the attack on Pearl Harbor, which Toland co-directed with John Ford, is so realistic in its restaged footage that many today mistake it for actual attack footage. This 82-minute film was trimmed by censors into a 20-minute version, which took the Academy Award for Best Documentary (Short Subject), and was released in its entirety in 1991.

Filmography
As a cinematographer

Awards and nominations
Academy Awards

Legacy
The results of a survey conducted in 2003 by the International Cinematographers Guild placed Toland in the top ten of history's most influential cinematographers.

The 2006 Los Angeles edition of CineGear assembled a distinguished panel composed of Owen Roizman, László Kovács, Daryn Okada, Rodrigo Prieto, Russell Carpenter, Dariusz Wolski, and others. Called "Dialogue With ASC Cinematographers," the panel was asked to name two or three other cinematographers, living or dead, who had influenced their work or whom they considered to be the best of the best. Each panel member cited Gregg Toland first.

References

External links

 
 Internet Encyclopedia of Cinematographers 
 The Motion Picture Cameraman article written by Toland

1904 births
1948 deaths
American cinematographers
Best Cinematographer Academy Award winners
Burials at Hollywood Forever Cemetery
People from Charleston, Illinois
Deaths from coronary thrombosis